Volmer may refer to:

People
 Arvo Volmer (born 1962), Estonian conductor
 Hardi Volmer (born 1957), Estonian film director, puppet theatre set decorator and musician
 Joost Volmer (born 1974), Dutch footballer
 Max Volmer (1885–1965), German physical chemist
 Priit Volmer (born 1978),  Estonian opera singer 
 Ron Volmer (born 1935), American water polo player who competed in the 1960 Summer Olympics

Fictional characters
 Rhonda Volmer, in the HBO series Big Love

Places
 Volmer, Alberta, an unincorporated community in Alberta, Canada

See also
 Volmerswerth, a borough in western Düsseldorf, Germany

Estonian-language surnames